Tedi Supriadi (born 26 January 1996 in Bandung) is a male Indonesian badminton player. He is a doubles specialist. He is from PB. Djarum, a badminton club in Kudus, Central Java and has joined the club since 2011.

In 2014 he won the mixed doubles together with Mychelle Crhystine Bandaso at the Jaya Raya Indonesia Junior International Challenge. In the same year he reached rank 2 in the men's doubles section together with Seiko Wahyu Kusdianto at the USM International Series. One year later he won bronze at the Victor Indonesia International Challenge in the mixed doubles together with Ririn Amelia.

Achievements

BWF International Challenge/Series 
Men's Doubles

 BWF International Challenge tournament
 BWF International Series tournament

References

External links 
 

1996 births
Living people
Indonesian male badminton players
Sportspeople from Bandung
21st-century Indonesian people